ISO 3166-2:AR is the entry for Argentina in ISO 3166-2, part of the ISO 3166 standard published by the International Organization for Standardization (ISO), which defines codes for the names of the principal subdivisions (e.g., provinces or states) of all countries coded in ISO 3166-1.

Currently for Argentina, ISO 3166-2 codes are defined for 1 city and 23 provinces. The city Buenos Aires is the capital of the country and has special status similar to the provinces.

Each code consists of two parts, separated by a hyphen. The second part is a letter, originally used in vehicle registration plates (the letters I and O are not used since they could be mistaken as 1 and 0 respectively and were left out of license plates), and currently used in postal codes.

Current codes
Subdivision names are listed as in the ISO 3166-2 standard published by the ISO 3166 Maintenance Agency (ISO 3166/MA).

Click on the button in the header to sort each column.

Changes
The following changes to the entry have been announced in newsletters by the ISO 3166/MA since the first publication of ISO 3166-2 in 1998:

See also
 Subdivisions of Argentina
 FIPS region codes of Argentina
 UN/LOCODE:AR

External links
 ISO Online Browsing Platform: AR
 Provinces of Argentina, Statoids.com

2:AR
ISO 3166-2
Argentina geography-related lists